Liljegren is a surname. Notable people with the surname include:

Christian Liljegren (born 1971), Swedish singer
Erik Liljegren, American television correspondent
Freddie Liljegren (born 1993), Swedish singer
Fredrik Liljegren (born 1969), Swedish computer scientist
Kirstin Liljegren (born 1996), Danish fashion model
Mike Liljegren, American football coach
Sofia Liljegren (1765–1795), Swedish-Finnish soprano
Sten Bodvar Liljegren (1885–1984), Swedish Anglist
Timothy Liljegren (born 1999), Swedish ice hockey player